Ipazoltic ( "among herbs") is a town in the municipality of San Martín de Hidalgo in the Mexican state of Jalisco. It is located 500 km West of the capital, Mexico City. There are about 533 inhabitants located in Ipazoltic.

Its foundation dates back to the pre-conquest times, having been inhabited by the Tepehuán peoples.

References

Populated places in Jalisco